The 2010 Ivy League Baseball Championship Series took place at Robertson Field at Satow Stadium in New York City on May 8 and 9, 2010.  The series matched the regular season champions of each of the league's two divisions.  , the winner of the series, claimed the Ivy League's automatic berth in the 2010 NCAA Division I baseball tournament.  It was Dartmouth's second consecutive, and second overall, coming in their third consecutive appearance.

Columbia made its third appearance, and second in three years in the Championship Series.

Results

References

Ivy League Baseball Championship Series
Tournament
Ivy League Baseball Championship Series